Major-General Sir Isaac Brock KB (6 October 1769 – 13 October 1812) was a British Army officer and colonial administrator from Guernsey. Brock was assigned to Lower Canada in 1802. Despite facing desertions and near-mutinies, he commanded his regiment in Upper Canada (part of present-day Ontario) successfully for many years. He was promoted to major general, and became responsible for defending Upper Canada against the United States. While many in Canada and Britain believed war could be averted, Brock began to ready the army and militia for what was to come. When the War of 1812 broke out, the populace was prepared, and quick victories at Fort Mackinac and Detroit defeated American invasion efforts.

Brock's actions, particularly his success at Detroit, earned him accolades including a knighthood in the Order of the Bath and the sobriquet "The Hero of Upper Canada". His name is often linked with that of the Native American leader Tecumseh, although the two men collaborated in person only for a few days. Brock died at the Battle of Queenston Heights, which the British won.

Early life

Brock was born at St Peter Port on the Channel Island of Guernsey, the eighth son of John Brock (1729–1777), a midshipman in the Royal Navy, and Elizabeth de Lisle, daughter of Daniel de Lisle, then Lieutenant-Bailiff of Guernsey. The Brocks were an English family who had been established in Guernsey since the sixteenth century. Brock earned a reputation during his early education on Guernsey as an assiduous student, as well as an exceptional swimmer and boxer. At age ten, he was sent to school in Southampton. He also studied for one year in Rotterdam, learning French.

Despite his lack of an extensive formal education, Brock appreciated its importance. As an adult, he spent much time reading in an attempt to improve his education. He read many works on military tactics and science, but he also read ancient history and other less immediately practical topics. At the time of his death, he owned a modest library of books, including classic works by Shakespeare, Voltaire, and Samuel Johnson.

Though Brock was noted as a handsome man who enjoyed the company of women, he never married.

Military service
Brock had a successful pre-war military career and a quick rise through the ranks, which many commented on at the time. Some credited luck and others skill in his rapid promotions, and Brock had substantial portions of both on his way to prominence. Lacking special political connections, Brock's ability to gain promotions even when the nation was at peace attests to his skills in recruiting men and organizing finances, and ambition.

Early career

At the age of fifteen, Brock joined the 8th (The King's) Regiment of Foot on 8 March 1785 with the rank of ensign, and was likely given responsibility for the regimental colours. His elder brother John was already an officer in the same regiment. As was usual at the time, Brock's commission was purchased. On 16 January 1790 he bought the rank of lieutenant and later that year he raised his own company of men. As a result, he was promoted to captain (of an Independent Company of foot) on 27 January 1791 and transferred to the 49th (Hertfordshire) Regiment of Foot on 15 June 1791.

His nephew and biographer (Ferdinand Brock Tupper) asserts that shortly after Brock joined the regiment, a professional dueller forced a match on him. As the one being challenged Brock had his choice of terms, and he insisted that they use pistols. His friends were shocked as Brock was a large target and his opponent an expert shot. Brock, however, refused to change his mind. When the duellist arrived at the field, he asked Brock to decide how many paces they would take. Brock insisted that the duel would take place not at the usual range, but at handkerchief distance (i.e., close range). The duellist declined and subsequently was forced to leave the regiment. This contributed to Brock's popularity and reputation among his fellow officers, as this duellist had a formidable reputation and was reportedly regarded as a bully in the regiment. During his time with this regiment, Brock served in the Caribbean, where he fell ill with fever and nearly died. He did not fully recover until after returning to England in 1793.

Once back in Britain he spent much of his time recruiting, and he was placed in charge of recruits on Jersey. He purchased his majority on 27 June 1795, and rejoined his regiment in 1796, when the rest of his men returned from the West Indies.

First command
On 28 October 1797 Brock purchased the rank of lieutenant-colonel for £3,000, and became acting commanding officer of the regiment, assuming substantive command on 22 March 1798 with the retirement of Lieutenant Colonel Frederick Keppel. The rank was apparently bought cheaply; his predecessor from whom he purchased the rank was advised to sell up and leave the army rather than face a court martial and probable dismissal.

In 1799 the 49th was assigned to the Helder Expedition against the Batavian Republic (now known as the Netherlands), to be led by Sir Ralph Abercromby. During the troop landings, Brock saw his first combat on 10 September 1799 under the command of then-Major-General John Moore. Given that the 49th was in poor shape when Brock took command, they saw little actual combat. Likely Moore was sparing them and using more experienced troops to establish the beachhead. Finally on 2 October the 49th was actively involved in heavy combat at the Battle of Alkmaar, where they acquitted themselves well, sustaining only 33 deaths.

The 49th had been ordered to proceed up the beaches of Egmont-op-Zee, a steep climb through sand dunes and poor terrain. The risks were exacerbated by harassment from French sharpshooters, who had excellent cover. After about six hours of heavy fighting, the attack was stopped about a mile (1.6 km) short of the British objective. After an hour of close combat, the French began to withdraw. Brock was injured in the fighting when hit in the throat by a spent musket ball. His neck cloth prevented a possibly fatal injury. In his own words, "I got knocked down shortly after the enemy began to retreat, but never quitted the field, and returned to my duty in less than half an hour."

In 1801 while aboard the 74-gun  (commanded by Captain Thomas Fremantle, a personal friend), Brock was present at the Battle of Copenhagen. His troops were supposed to lead an assault on the forts at Copenhagen. The outcome of the sea battle made such an assault unnecessary, and Brock was able to observe first-hand the tactical brilliance of Lord Nelson. After the battle, Fremantle and Brock celebrated the victory with Nelson. In 1802, Brock and the 49th were ordered to Canada.

Transfer to Canada
Brock arrived in Canada with the rest of the 49th and was initially assigned to Montreal. Almost immediately, in 1804 he was faced with one of the primary problems in Canada: desertion. Seven soldiers stole a boat and fled across the river (and border) into the United States. Despite having no jurisdiction on American soil, Brock sent a party across the border in pursuit and the men were captured.

Mutiny
A short time later Brock received a report from Fort George that some of the garrison were planning to imprison the officers and flee to the U.S. Immediately he boarded the schooner that had brought the message and proceeded to Fort George, under the command of then-Lieutenant-Colonel Roger Hale Sheaffe. A hastily assembled honour guard formed to greet Brock's unexpected arrival. Alone on entering the fort, Brock ordered the sergeant of the guard to disarm and had him confined.

As it was the dinner hour, all the soldiers were in barracks. Brock ordered the drummers to call out the men. He ordered the first officer on the scene, Lieutenant Williams, to bring him a soldier suspected of being one of the mutiny's ringleaders. Pinning the man with a sabre, Williams took him into custody. The other suspected mutineers were also captured.

Brock sent the twelve mutineers and the seven deserters to Quebec for court martial. The mutineers had planned to jail all the officers (save Sheaffe, who was to be killed) and to cross the Niagara River into the U.S. at Queenston. Seven soldiers were subsequently executed by firing squad. The mutineers testified that they were forced to such measures by the severity of Sheaffe's command. They said if they had continued under Brock's command, they would never have taken such action. Brock was evidently upset by the news that the conspirators had been shot. In a botched execution, the firing squad discharged their weapons at too long a distance, so that the condemned men were not killed instantly.

Brock's younger brother John Savery Brock was compelled to retire from the Royal Navy after his involvement in a mutinous incident; he induced "his brother midshipmen of the fleet at Spithead to sign a round robin against their being subjected to the practice of mast-heading." "He was recommended privately to retire from the service."

Pre-war preparations

After a period of leave in England over winter 1805–1806 and promotion to colonel on 29 October 1805, Brock returned to Canada temporarily in command of the entire British army there. By 1806 the United States was becoming increasingly hostile to the British Empire; relations between the two nations continued to deteriorate until war finally broke out in 1812.

The United States had grievances at British violations of American sovereignty (their navy was impressing US sailors), restriction of American trade by Britain, and an American desire to gain territory by invading and annexing the poorly defended British North American colonies. American grievances included the impressment of American sailors by the Royal Navy, the blockade of French ports, and a belief that the British were inciting American Indians to attack U.S. settlements on the western frontier. War hawks in the U.S. called for an invasion of Canada to punish the British Empire and to lessen the threat to American interests represented by the Native Americans. At the same time, the US leaders believed that the growing population needed new territory; some imagined that the United States was destined to control all of the North American continent. (This philosophy was later known as Manifest Destiny.) American hawks assumed that Canadian colonists would rise up and support the invading U.S. armies as liberators and that, as Thomas Jefferson famously wrote, conquering Canada would be "a mere matter of marching".

In response to this emerging threat, Brock moved quickly to bolster Canadian defences. He strengthened the fortifications of Quebec by building walls and an elevated battery. Brock succeeded in creating a formidable defensive position due largely to his military reading, which included several volumes on the science of running and setting up artillery. He also rearranged and strengthened the Provincial Marine (responsible for transport on the lakes and rivers). He ordered warships to be built and developed a naval force capable of holding the Great Lakes. This was to be pivotal during the war. But Brock's appropriation of civilian lands and labour for military use brought him into conflict with the civilian authorities led by Thomas Dunn.

In 1807 Brock was appointed brigadier general by Governor General Sir James Henry Craig, the new commander of Canadian forces. He was to take command of all forces in Upper Canada in 1810. During this time Brock continued to ask for a posting in Europe. In June 1811 he was promoted to major general and in October of that year Lieutenant Governor Francis Gore left for England. Brock was sent to Upper Canada as senior officer commander of the troops and senior member of the [executive] council, putting him fully in charge of both the military and civil authority. He was usually referred to as president of the council or administrator of Upper Canada (never as lieutenant governor). When permission to leave for Europe finally came in early 1812, Brock declined the offer, believing he had a duty to defend Canada in war against the United States.

As Upper Canada's administrator, Brock made a series of changes to prepare for war. He amended the militia act to allow use of all available volunteers and ordered enhanced training of these raw recruits, despite opposition from the provincial legislature. He continued strengthening and reinforcing defences. Brock also began seeking out First Nations leaders, such as the Shawnee chief Tecumseh, to build alliances with him against the Americans in the event of war. Although the conventional wisdom of the day was that Canada would fall quickly in the event of an invasion, Brock pursued these strategies to give the colony a fighting chance.

Meanwhile, back in England, Brock's brother William faced financial difficulties, as the bank in which he was a senior partner failed. Isaac's commissions had been purchased with a loan entered into the bank's books by his brother, and the Brocks faced a demand for payment. Isaac could not meet the £3000 debt, but made over the whole of his salary to his brother Irving, to be used for whatever was considered most critical: his commission debt or the family's other bills.

War of 1812

Early war and the capture of Detroit

The United States declared war on Britain on 18 June 1812. Despite his preparations, Brock was worried about Canadian security. In Upper Canada, besides the militia, there was only one British regular infantry regiment, a detachment of retired veterans, and a company of artillery. These had to be dispersed among several widely separated posts. Brock's advantage was that the armed vessels of the Provincial Marine controlled the lakes, and allowed him to move his reserves rapidly between threatened points.

Brock continually kept the commanders of his posts informed of all developments. When news of the outbreak of war reached him, he sent a canoe party under the noted trader and voyager William McKay to the British outpost at St. Joseph Island on Lake Huron. His orders to commander (Captain Charles Roberts) allowed him to stand on the defensive or attack the nearby American outpost at Fort Mackinac at his discretion. Roberts immediately launched an attack on Fort Mackinac with a scratch force of regulars, fur traders, and First Nations warriors. On 17 July, the American garrison was taken by surprise (not being aware that war had been declared) and surrendered. This victory immediately encouraged many First Nations tribes, who had hitherto been neutral or undecided, to give their active support to the British. They hoped to expel the American settlers from their territories west of the Appalachian Mountains.

Brock felt he needed to go further. He was hampered by Governor General George Prevost, who had replaced Craig in late 1811. Prevost's orders from the government, and his own inclinations, were to emphasise defence. Prevost kept the bulk of his forces in Lower Canada to protect Quebec, and opposed any attack into United States. Brock also believed that he was handicapped by inertia and defeatism among the legislature and other officials.

He wrote to Prevost's adjutant general,
My situation is most critical, not from anything the enemy can do, but from the disposition of the people – The Population, believe me is essentially bad – A full belief possesses them that this Province must inevitably succumb – This Prepossession is fatal to every exertion – Legislators, Magistrates, Militia Officers, all, have imbibed the idea, and are so sluggish and indifferent in all their respective offices that the artful and active scoundrel is allowed to parade the Country without interruption, and commit all imaginable mischief... What a change an additional regiment would make in this part of the Province! Most of the people have lost all confidence – I however speak loud and look big.

On 12 July, an American army under William Hull had invaded Canada at Sandwich (later known as Windsor). The invasion was quickly halted, and Hull withdrew, but this gave Brock the excuse he needed to abandon Prevost's orders. Having finally obtained limited support from the legislature for his measures to defend the Province, Brock prorogued the Assembly and set out on 6 August with a small body of regulars and some volunteers from the York Militia (the "York Volunteers") to reinforce the garrison at Fort Malden – Amherstburg at the western end of Lake Erie, facing Hull's position at Detroit. Travelling mainly by water in bad weather, Brock reached Amherstburg on 13 August.

Here, Brock met Tecumseh, and was immediately impressed. Brock also read American dispatches captured from Hull's army. He quickly judged Hull to be timid and afraid of the First Nations in particular, and the American force to be demoralised and short of rations. Against the advice of his officers, Brock immediately prepared to launch an attack on Detroit.

He later (3 September) wrote to his brothers,
Some say that nothing could be more desperate than the measure, but I answer that the state of the Province admitted of nothing but desperate remedies. I got possession of the letters my antagonist addressed to the Secretary at War, and also of the sentiments which hundreds of his army uttered to their friends. Confidence in the General was gone, and evident despondency prevailed throughout. I have succeeded beyond expectation. I crossed the river contrary to the opinion of Cols. Procter, St. George etc.; it is therefore no wonder that envy should attribute to good fortune what in justice to my own discernment, I must say, proceeded from a cool calculation of the pours and contres.

Even with his First Nations allies, Brock was outnumbered.  His force included 600 "Indians" and 1300 soldiers, as well as two battleships, according to his later report. Hull had 2,500 soldiers under his command.

He decided to use tricks to intimidate Hull. He dressed his militia contingent in uniforms discarded by his regulars, making it appear (at a distance) as if his force consisted entirely of British regular infantry. Brock laid siege to Fort Detroit, from established artillery positions across the river in Sandwich. Through a carefully crafted series of marches, he gave the appearance of having much more numerous forces. He had Tecumseh's forces cross in front of the fort several times (doubling back under cover), intimidating Hull with the show of a large, raucous, barely controlled group of First Nations warriors. Finally, he sent Hull a letter demanding his surrender, in which he stated, in part, "It is far from my inclination to join in a war of extermination, but you must be aware that the numerous body of Indians who have attached themselves to my troops will be beyond my control the moment the contest commences." Brock hammered the fort with cannon fire.

On 16 August, the day after receiving Brock's letter, Hull surrendered. Hull, elderly and without recent military experience, was terrified by the risk of losing the battle.
 He later wrote that the surrender had saved 2,500 troops and 700 civilians from "the horrors of an Indian massacre".

The capture of Detroit and Hull's army wounded American morale, and eliminated the main American force in the area as a threat, while at the same time boosting morale among his own forces. Brock took the American supplies at Detroit and used them for his own forces, particularly the ill-equipped militia. Under prize regulations, a substantial part of the value of the captured military stores would accrue to him. (If he had lived longer, he could have settled his debts.) Brock valued the captured ordnance supplies at £30,000. Finally, the victory secured the support of Tecumseh and the other chiefs in his confederation, who took Brock's actions as both a sign of competence and a willingness to take action.

Tecumseh evidently trusted and respected Brock, reportedly saying, "This is a man" after meeting him for the first time. Although Brock's correspondence indicates a certain amount of paternal condescension for the First Nations, he seems to have regarded Tecumseh very highly, calling him "the Wellington of the Indians", and saying "a more sagacious or a more gallant warrior does not I believe exist". Brock made a number of commitments to the Shawnee. He promised to negotiate no peace treaty without addressing the Shawnee's vision of an independent homeland. There is no evidence Brock negotiated in bad faith. Brock's personal integrity and respect for First Nations peoples has been well documented, and suggest that if he had lived he would have kept his word to the Shawnee.

The capture of Detroit led to British domination over most of Michigan Territory. Brock had planned to continue his campaign into the U.S., but he was thwarted by negotiation of an armistice by Prevost with American Major General Henry Dearborn. This stalled Brock's momentum, and gave the Americans time to regroup and prepare to invade Canada. Unable to predict the point of invasion, Brock frantically worked to prepare defences throughout Upper Canada.

The Prince Regent decreed a silver medal be struck for presentation to the senior officers to commemorate the event.

Death at Battle of Queenston Heights

Meanwhile, American general Stephen Van Rensselaer III, a Federalist political appointee, in command of a sizable army near Lewiston, was pressured by the American president to invade. Although Van Rensselaer had severe doubts about the quality of his troops, he had no choice but to attack. He was an inexperienced militia general, and not trusted by the majority of regular army troops. In the early morning of 13 October 1812, he attempted to cross the Niagara River, leading to the Battle of Queenston Heights. Despite heavy fire from British artillery, the first wave of Americans (under Captain John E. Wool) managed to land, and then follow a fishermen's path up to the heights. From this point, they attacked and routed the British artillery. Brock had arrived from nearby Fort George and moved up to the artillery battery to gain a better view only minutes before Wool attacked. He, his aides, and the gunners were forced to beat a hasty retreat, leading their horses down the steep slope.

Fearing that the Americans would move the rest of their troops across the river, Brock ordered an immediate attack on their position. True to his philosophy of never ordering men where he would not lead them, he personally led the charge on foot. Brock's charge was made by Dennis' and Williams' two companies of the 49th and two companies of militia. The assault was halted by heavy fire and as he noticed unwounded men dropping to the rear, Brock shouted angrily that "This is the first time I have ever seen the 49th turn their backs! Surely the heroes of Egmont will not tarnish their record!" At this rebuke, the ranks promptly closed up and were joined by two more companies of militia, those of Cameron and Heward. Brock saw that the militia supports were lagging behind at the foot of the hill and ordered one of his Provincial aides-de-camp, Lieutenant Colonel John Macdonell, to "Push on the York Volunteers," while he led his own party to the right, presumably intending to join his party with that of Williams' detachment, who were beginning to make progress on that flank.

Brock was struck in the wrist of his sword arm by a musket ball but continued to press home the attack. His height and energetic gestures, together with his officer's uniform and a gaudy sash given to him eight weeks earlier by Tecumseh after the siege of Detroit, made him a conspicuous target. An unknown American stepped forward from a thicket and fired at a range of barely fifty yards. The musketball struck Brock in the chest and he fell. His last words have been reported as "Push on, brave York Volunteers" (in reference to a group of the militia Brock favoured) or "Push on, don't mind me" or Surgite! (Latin for "rise" or "push on"  – now used as a motto by Brock University), and even "a request that his fall might not be noticed or prevent the advance of his brave troops, adding a wish, which could not be distinctly understood, that some token of remembrance should be transmitted to his sister." These accounts are considered unlikely, since he was not in the company of the York Volunteers but regular soldiers at the time and it is also reported that Brock died almost immediately without speaking, and the hole in his uniform suggests that the bullet entered his heart. His body was carried from the field and secreted in a nearby house at the corner of Queenston and Partition streets, diagonally opposite that of Laura Secord.

Following the death of Brock, Lieutenant-Colonel John Macdonell became the senior officer. A lawyer by trade and having little military experience, Macdonell led a second attempt to retake the redan. With Williams' men of the 49th starting from brush to the right of the line near the escarpment and Macdonell's anchoring the left, the force of between 70 and 80 men (more than half of whom were militia) advanced toward the redan. Wool had been reinforced by more troops who had just made their way up the path to the top of the Heights, and Macdonell faced some four hundred troops. During the charge, it is reported that the 49th used "Revenge the General" as a battle cry.

Despite the disadvantage in numbers as well as attacking a fixed position, Williams' and Macdonell's small force was driving the opposing force to the edge of the gorge on which the redan was situated, and seemed on the verge of success before the Americans were able to regroup and stand firm. The momentum of the battle turned when a musket ball hit Macdonell's mount (causing it to rear and twist around) and another shot hit him in the small of the back, causing him to fall from the horse. He was removed from the battlefield and died from his injuries early the next day. Captain Williams was laid low by a wound to the head, and Dennis by a severe wound to the thigh (although he continued to lead his detachment throughout the action). Carrying Macdonnell and the body of Brock, the British fell back through Queenston to Durham's Farm, a mile north near Vrooman's Point.

In the afternoon, Sheaffe arrived on the battlefield with reinforcements and took command of the British forces. In sharp contrast to his predecessors' direct attacks, Sheaffe took a more cautious approach. This ultimately proved successful, leading to a total victory over the Americans.

Burial

After the battle, Sheaffe and his staff decided to entrust the funeral arrangements to Captain John Glegg, who had served with Brock for many years. On 16 October, a funeral procession for Brock and Colonel Macdonell went from Government House to Fort George, with soldiers from the British Army, the colonial militia, and First Nations warriors on either side of the route. The caskets were lowered into a freshly dug grave at the northeast corner of Fort George. The British fired a twenty-one gun salute in three salvos, in a gesture of respect. Later that day, the American garrison at Fort Niagara respectfully fired a similar salute. Over five thousand people attended the funeral, a remarkable number given the limited population of Upper Canada at that time.

A small cairn at the foot of the Niagara Escarpment marks the spot where Brock fell. In 1824, Brock's and Macdonell's remains were moved into Brock's Monument, which overlooked the Queenston Heights. That original monument was bombed and heavily damaged in 1840. (This action was reputedly by Irish-Canadian terrorist Benjamin Lett although a subsequent Assize failed to confirm this.). Brock's remains were reinterred inside the new Monument on 13 October 1853. An inscription reads: "Upper Canada has dedicated this monument to the memory of the late Major-General Isaac Brock, K.B. provisional lieutenant-governor and commander of the forces in the province whose remains are deposited in the vault beneath. Opposing the invading enemy he fell in action near these heights on 13 October 1812, in the forty-third year of his age. Revered and lamented by the people whom he governed and deplored by the sovereign to whose services his life had been devoted."

Legacy

On British leadership

British military leadership, which had been decisive up to Brock's death, suffered a blow with his loss. His direct successor, Major-General Sheaffe, although successful in his approach at Queenston Heights, was never able to live up to Brock's reputation. He was criticised by many, including John Strachan, for his retreat at the Battle of York, and was shortly after recalled to England, where he continued a successful, if not brilliant, military career.

Brock's successor at Detroit, however, fared much worse. Colonel Henry Procter faced an attack from a resurrected American Army of the Northwest under future President William Henry Harrison. Harrison set out to retake Detroit, but a detachment of his army was defeated at Frenchtown on 22 January 1813. Procter, displaying poor judgement, left the prisoners in the custody of his First Nations allies, who proceeded to execute an indeterminate number of them. Subsequent American victories allowed Harrison to attempt another invasion of Canada, which led to the Battle of the Thames on 5 October 1813. After a successful American charge, Procter's forces turned and fled, leaving Tecumseh and his American Indian troops to fight alone. They fought on, eventually being defeated. Perhaps of more importance to the British, at this battle Tecumseh died, and their alliance with the American Indians effectively ended.

As for Governor General Prevost, who often clashed with Brock, he remained in command of all British forces until after the Battle of Plattsburgh, in 1814. The battle was intended to be a joint naval/infantry attack, but Prevost did not commit his forces until after the naval battle had nearly ended. When he finally did attack, his forces proved unable to cross the Saranac River bridge, which was held by a small group of American regulars under the command of the recently promoted John E. Wool. Despite a heavy advantage in manpower, Prevost finally retreated upon hearing of the failure of the naval attack. For his failure at Plattsburgh, Prevost was recalled to England to face an inquiry, and a naval court martial determined that the blame for the loss at Plattsburgh primarily rested with Prevost. Prevost's health failed him, and he died in early 1816.

In Britain

Although Brock's achievements in Canada were overshadowed by larger-scale fighting in Europe, his death was still widely noted, particularly in Guernsey. In London, he is remembered at a memorial in St Paul's Cathedral. This was paid for by £1575 voted by the House of Commons, which also granted pensions of £200 to each of his four surviving brothers. For his actions in the capture of Detroit, Brock was appointed a Knight Companion of the Order of the Bath (KB) on 10 October 1812. He died at the Battle of Queenston Heights before learning of his knighthood.

As a mark of esteem, the Prince Regent made a special grant to allow the heraldic supporters that would have been incorporated into his coat of arms if he had lived, to be incorporated into the arms of Brock's father's descendants, and on monuments raised in Brock's memory.

A British naval vessel named in his honour, HMS Sir Isaac Brock, was destroyed at the Battle of York while under construction to prevent it falling into enemy hands. The Regimental Depot of the 49th of Foot (later the Royal Berkshire Regiment), was established at Reading and named Brock Barracks in his memory in 1934. It is now used as a cadets and reserve infantry centre.

In Canada
Canadians regard Brock as one of their greatest military heroes. He was voted number 28 on the television show The Greatest Canadian, although he was not born or naturalized as a Canadian.

Although many Canadians have come to view Brock as one of their own, Brock never really felt at home in Canada. On the whole, he viewed the country as a backwater, and earnestly wished to return to Europe to fight against Napoleon. Brock mistrusted the Canadian colonists, many of whom he suspected of being American sympathizers, and he was reluctant to arm them indiscriminately to help defend the colonies. He favoured expansion of volunteer forces which could be trained and supervised, as well as the use of British regulars and Tecumseh's warriors.

Since his death, several legends and myths about Brock have arisen. In 1908, the story of Brock's betrothal to Sophia Shaw, the daughter of General Æneas Shaw, was first published. There is no supporting evidence for the claim and most biographers consider it apocryphal. A legend about Brock's horse Alfred was first published in 1859. The horse was supposedly shot and killed during the battle while being ridden by Macdonell, and it is commemorated in a monument erected in 1976 in Queenston near the cairn marking the spot where Brock fell. But little evidence supports this account. The General's horse "fully caparisoned, led by four Grooms," is listed as preceding the coffin at the General's interment at Fort George.

In 1816, an unknown company issued a series of private half-penny tokens honouring Brock with the title "The Hero of Upper Canada". Private copper tokens became common in Canada due to initial distrust of "army bills", paper notes issued by Brock when there was a currency shortage caused by economic growth.

Brockville and Brock in Ontario, Brock in Saskatchewan, General Isaac Brock Parkway on Highway 405 and Brock University in St. Catharines, Ontario, are all named in tribute to Brock. Schools named in his honour include one in Winnipeg, and public schools in Toronto, Guelph, Hamilton, London, Vancouver, and Windsor, Ontario. An Ontario Historical Plaque was erected by the province to commemorate Major-General Sir Isaac Brock's role in Ontario's heritage. The section of Spadina Avenue south of Queen Street in Toronto was once named Brock Street in his honour.

In September 2012, the Royal Canadian Mint issued a .99999 pure gold coin with a face value of 350 dollars to honor the bicentenary of Brock's death. The reverse design was taken from a half-penny token issued in 1816 as a memorial to Brock. In addition, there have been quarters that have been released, one with a coloured maple leaf and the other with a frosted maple leaf.

The Bathurst Street Bridge was renamed the Sir Isaac Brock Bridge by the City of Toronto at the suggestion of the Friends of Fort York.

In Guernsey
Brock's childhood home on High Street, St Peter Port, Guernsey still stands, and is marked with a memorial plaque. A memorial, paid for by Canada, is fitted into the side of the Town Church, the parish church of St Peter Port.

Brock University in Ontario provides scholarships to Guernsey students who achieve sufficiently high grades. In 1969, the Guernsey Post Office issued postage stamps to commemorate his life and achievements.

Notes and references
Notes

Citations

References

Further reading

 
 
 
 
 
 
 
 
 
 Published dispatches by Brock relating to the capture of Fort Detroit.

External links

 Historica.ca Article on Isaac Brock, Complete With References
 Information on Isaac Brock's family and genealogy
 The Friends of Fort George: Brock's Monument
 Brock University
 
 
 Various Research on Isaac Brock Brock University Library Digital Repository

British Army major generals
British Army personnel of the French Revolutionary Wars
British Army commanders of the Napoleonic Wars
British Army personnel of the War of 1812
Guernsey expatriates in Canada
People of pre-statehood Michigan
Knights Companion of the Order of the Bath
Lieutenant-Governors of Upper Canada
People from Niagara Falls, Ontario
British military personnel killed in the War of 1812
49th Regiment of Foot officers
1769 births
1812 deaths
Persons of National Historic Significance (Canada)
People from Saint Peter Port
British people of the War of 1812
British military personnel of the War of 1812
Canadian people of the War of 1812